
Bouchet lake (or Lake of Bouchet; French: Lac du Bouchet) is located in Haute-Loire, France next to Le Puy-en-Velay. It is about 1.6 km (one mile) north of the village of Le Bouchet-Saint-Nicolas. It is located on the territory of the communes of Cayres and Le Bouchet-Saint-Nicolas

Bouchet is a crater lake formed from an old volcano, and thus roughly circular. It is a little more than half a mile from rim to rim and surrounded by woodlands. It is at an altitude of 1,208 m (3,963 feet).

External links

Lake of Bouchet, picture.

Bouchet
Landforms of Haute-Loire
Bouchet